Giacomo Pasi (died 1528) was a Roman Catholic prelate who served as Bishop of Faenza (1510–1528).

Biography
On 8 April 1510, Giacomo Pasi was appointed during the papacy of Pope Julius II as Bishop of Faenza. He served as Bishop of Faenza until his death on 19 July 1528.

References

External links and additional sources
 (for Chronology of Bishops) 
 (for Chronology of Bishops)  

16th-century Italian Roman Catholic bishops
Bishops appointed by Pope Julius II
1528 deaths